Robert Louis Kessler (November 25, 1914 – September 5, 2001) was standout basketball player at Purdue University in the NCAA and then with the Indianapolis Kautskys in the National Basketball League (NBL).

Kessler was from Anderson, Indiana and attended Anderson High School where he graduated in 1932. He then enrolled at Purdue and played on the men's varsity basketball team for his final three years under future Hall of Fame coach Ward Lambert. Kessler was a two-time All-American (1935–36), and as a senior he became Purdue's first ever consensus All-American.

After college, Kessler played professionally for three seasons in the NBL for the Indianapolis Kautskys. He was named the league's Rookie of the Year in 1937–38, although Kessler's teams never once qualified for the postseason. In his later life, Kessler worked at General Motors and eventually became its vice president.

References

External links
NBL career stats

1914 births
2001 deaths
All-American college men's basketball players
American men's basketball players
Basketball players from Indiana
Forwards (basketball)
General Motors former executives
Hammond Ciesar All-Americans players
Indianapolis Kautskys players
Purdue Boilermakers men's basketball players
Sportspeople from Anderson, Indiana